Swan Song is a 1947 detective novel by the British writer Edmund Crispin, the fourth in his series featuring the Oxford Don and amateur detective Gervase Fen. It was the first in a new three-book contract the author has signed with his publishers. It received a mixed review from critics.

Stage adaptation
In 1986 the novel was adapted into a play which was staged in New York City by Tony Tanner. It shifted the location from Oxford to Cambridge and changed the opera being performed to Rossini's The Barber of Seville.

Synopsis
Fen becomes dragged into the complexities rivalries of an opera company who are to perform the Wagner's The Mastersingers of Nuremberg for the first time in Britain since the Second World War. When one of the singers, widely loathed by the rest of the company, is found hanging dead in his dressing room Fen becomes the driving force behind the investigation. A second murder threatens to derail the opening night, but Fen has at last cracked the case.

See also
 Golden Age of Detective Fiction

References

Bibliography
 Hubin, Allen J. Crime Fiction, 1749-1980: A Comprehensive Bibliography. Garland Publishing, 1984.
 Lachman, Marvin. The Villainous Stage: Crime Plays on Broadway and in the West End. McFarland, 2014.
 Reilly, John M. Twentieth Century Crime & Mystery Writers. Springer, 2015.
 Whittle, David. Bruce Montgomery/Edmund Crispin: A Life in Music and Books. Routledge, 2017.

1947 British novels
British mystery novels
British crime novels
Novels by Edmund Crispin
Novels set in Oxford
British detective novels
Victor Gollancz Ltd books